These are the official results of the Women's 10 km Walk event at the 1987 World Championships in Rome, Italy. The race was held on Tuesday 1 September 1987.

Medalists

Abbreviations
All times shown are in hours:minutes:seconds

Records

Final ranking

See also
 1986 Women's European Championships 10km Walk (Stuttgart)
 1987 Race Walking Year Ranking
 1990 Women's European Championships 10km Walk (Split)
 1992 Women's Olympic 10km Walk (Barcelona)

References
 Results
 Die Leichtathletik-Statistik-Seite

W
Racewalking at the World Athletics Championships
1987 in women's athletics